Bisfi Assembly constituency is an assembly constituency in Madhubani district in the Indian state of Bihar. As of 2020, Haribhushan Thakur of BJP is the MLA.

Overview
As per Delimitation of Parliamentary and Assembly constituencies Order, 2008, No. 35  Bisfi Assembly constituency is composed of the following: Bisfi community development blocks; Satlakha, Rahika, Saurath, Najirpur, Jagatpur, Kakraul North, Kakraul South, Malangia, Basauli, Sapta, Ijra and Hasanpur gram panchayats of Rahika, Madhubani, Bihar CD Block.

Bisfi Assembly constituency is part of No. 6 Madhubani (Lok Sabha constituency).

Election results

1977-2015
In the Bihar legislative assembly election, 2015, Dr. Faiyaz Ahmad of RJD defeated Manoj Kumar Yadav Bhojpandaul of RLSP by a margin of 35,325 votes & became 2nd Term MLA. In November 2010 state assembly elections, Dr. Faiyaz Ahmad of RJD defeated his nearest rival Hari Bhusan Thakur of JD(U). Contests in most years were multi cornered but only winners and runners up are being mentioned. Hari Bhusan Thakur, contesting as an Independent, defeated Md. Ahmar Hussain of Congress in October 2005 and February 2005. Dr. Shakil Ahmad of Congress defeated Abdul Hai of RJD in 2000. Ram Chandra Yadav of CPI defeated Dr. Shakil Ahmad of Congress in 1995. Dr. Shakeel Ahmed of Congress defeated Ram Chandra Yadav of CPI in 1990 and Raj Kumar Purbe of CPI in 1985. Raj Kumar Purbe of CPI defeated Aziz Nooruddin of Congress in 1980 and Siazul Islam of JP in 1977.

Members of Legislative Assembly

Election results

2020

References

External links
 

Assembly constituencies of Bihar
Politics of Madhubani district